Henry James Hope (3 September 1912 – 30 September 1965) was an Australian politician.

He was born in Hobart. In 1941 he was elected to the Tasmanian House of Assembly as a Labor member for Franklin. He was defeated in 1946, but returned in 1948 as a member for Denison. He was defeated again in 1950. Hope died in Sydney in 1965.

References

1912 births
1965 deaths
Members of the Tasmanian House of Assembly
Politicians from Hobart
Australian Labor Party members of the Parliament of Tasmania
20th-century Australian politicians